Up beat may refer to:

Upbeat, in music, the last beat in the previous bar which immediately precedes the downbeat
Anacrusis, a note (or sequence of notes) which precedes the first downbeat in a bar in a musical phrase
Upbeat (album), by the Fred Frith Guitar Quartet, 1999
Upbeat (TV program), an American musical show 1964–1971
Upbeat Records, an independent record label
 The Upbeat, a Californian band

See also
 
 
 Up (disambiguation)
 Beat (disambiguation)
 Beat Up (disambiguation)